Dimitris "Mitsos" Giotopoulos (Greek: Δημήτρης "Μήτσος" Γιοτόπουλος) was a Greek Marxist who fought in the Spanish Civil War.

Early life

He was born in 1901 in Giannitsou, Fthiotida. In 1920, he started studying chemistry at the University of Athens. He joined the Youth of KKE but he was erased from its ranks in 1921.  In 1923, he joined the Communist Archio-Marxist Party of Greece and became one of its leaders. In 1927, he became the leader of EKA, the Union of Communist Internationalists. In the 1930s, he was publishing the newspaper Πάλη των Τάξεων [=class struggle].According to some historians, he behaved in an authoritarian manner and opposed democratic processes. According to communist activist Agis Stinas, Giotopoulos received money and gave directions to his comrades in the name of a higher authority which did not really exist, as he took all decisions himself.

Cooperation with Trotsky

In 1926, Giotopoulos started speaking in favour of Trotsky in political meetings.  In 1932, he visited Trotsky at Büyükada. Giotopoulos informed Trotsky about the stance of his party towards KKE and about the existence of agrarian movement and agrarian reforms in Greece. Trotsky suggested that Communist Archio-Marxist Party of Greece should adopt the slogan "for a peasant-worker government." Giotopoulos disagreed with Trotsky on the independence of Thrace and Macedonia, and claimed that Macedonia was not ethnically homogeneous. He also pointed out that the Communist Archio-Marxist Party of Greece supported the self determination of Cyprus and of the Dodecanese; on the other hand, the alliance of KKE with the Bulgarian nationalists had diminished it popular appeal. 
After this meeting, Giotopoulos became the secretary of the Left Opposition under the name Witte. Giotopoulos disagreed with Trotsky on the creation of the Fourth International; Trotsky on the other hand, accused Giotopoulos of inactivity: "Until September, comrade Witte was our professional secretary for ... months. All comrades recognize that precisely during this period the International Secretariat was completely inexistent.  In 1934, the Communist Archio-Marxist Party of Greece split from Trotsky's movement after significant ideological fallout.

Spanish Civil War

After the coup of Metaxas, Giotopoulos went to France. He participated to the Spanish Civil War, affiliated with POUM. In 1937, he was imprisoned in Barcelona as part of the communist purge against POUM that started after the May Days. He was released in 1939 and he escaped to France.

Return to Greece

He returned to Greece from France after the end of World War II. He continued being the leader of the Archio-Marxist Party of Greece, which unlike the KKE operated legally. Said party, opposed the Democratic Army of Greece during the civil war and in 1949, his party sent a congratulatory telegram upon the victory of the Government on the Democratic Army of Greece. In his late years, he allegedly became a counselor of the conservative politician Theofylaktos Papakonstantinou.Alexandros Giotopoulos is his son.

References

1901 births
1965 deaths
Greek communists
Far-left politics
People from Makrakomi
Greek expatriates in Spain